Neuchâtel railway station serves the municipality of Neuchâtel, the capital city of the canton of Neuchâtel, Switzerland.  Opened in 1857, it is owned and operated by SBB-CFF-FFS.

The station forms part of one of Switzerland's most important railway lines, the Jura foot railway (Olten–Genève-Aéroport), which is one of two routes used by intercity trains between Geneva and Zürich.  It is also a junction for SBB-CFF-FFS lines to Le Locle and Pontarlier, and for the BLS line from Bern.

Location
Neuchâtel railway station is situated at Place de la Gare to the north east of the city centre, about a 15-minute walk from the central pedestrian zone. The Funambule funicular links the station to the lower part of the town, near the university.

Services 
 the following services stop at Neuchâtel:

 InterCity:
 RegioExpress:
 Regio:

See also

History of rail transport in Switzerland
Rail transport in Switzerland
Trams in Neuchâtel

References

External links
 
 
 Interactive station plan (Neuchâtel)
 Transports Régionaux Neuchâtelois - official site 

Railway stations in the canton of Neuchâtel
Swiss Federal Railways stations
Transport in Neuchâtel
Railway stations in Switzerland opened in 1857